Built to Last is the debut album by American hardcore punk band Hogan's Heroes. It was recorded at Waterfront Studios.

Album information
The album was recorded at Lenny Kravitz / Henry Hirsch Waterfront Studios, Hoboken, New Jersey and engineered by Rae Dileo. The album was originally released on Straight-On Records in 1988. It was reissued in May 1989 through Caroline Records.

Reception

East Coast Rockers'''  Makin' Waves said of "Built to Last  "...hardcore roots"  "...there's some really cool true blue rock 'n' roll on Built to Last..."

Kent McClard's No Answers No. 6 said "Built to Last'' contained "...scathing hardcore with extremely metallic guitar riffing" and that it was "explosive sounding".

Track listing

Personnel
George Barberio – lead guitar, vocals
John Cuccinello – bass, vocals
Tony Scandiffio – drums, vocals
Skip Hoefling – vocals

Production
Produced by Hogan's Heroes
Recorded and mixed by Rae Dileo

References

1988 debut albums
New Red Archives albums
Hogan's Heroes (band) albums